Misner may refer to:
Charles W. Misner, a physicist
Ivan Misner, American entrepreneur
Kameron Misner, American baseball player
Susan Misner, American actress and dancer
Gravitation (book), a book by Misner, Thorne, and Wheeler
sound engineer and record producer Tom Misner who founded SAE Institute Bangkok